Edinburgh University Press is a scholarly publisher of academic books and journals, based in Edinburgh, Scotland.

History
Edinburgh University Press was founded in the 1940s and became a wholly owned subsidiary of the University of Edinburgh in 1992. Books and journals published by the press carry the imprimatur of The University of Edinburgh. All proposed publishing projects are appraised and approved by the Press Committee, which consists of academics from the university. Since August 2004, the Press has had Charitable Status.

In November 2013, Edinburgh University Press acquired Dundee University Press for an undisclosed sum, with a stated aim to increase textbook and digital sales, with a particular focus on law. Brodies advised Edinburgh University Press on the terms of the acquisition.

Publishing
Edinburgh University Press publishes a range of research publications, which include scholarly monographs and reference works, as well as materials which are available on-line. The press also publishes textbooks for students and lecturers. The press publishes around 205 books and 42 journals each year.

Edinburgh University Press publishes mostly in humanities and social sciences.

Ebooks
The press participates in the ebook platforms University Press Scholarship Online (as Edinburgh Scholarship Online), Books at JSTOR and University Publishing Online, and also works with a number of ebook aggregators.

Open access
EUP supports both gold and green open access publishing, and is one of 13 publishers to participate in the Knowledge Unlatched pilot, a global library consortium approach to funding open access books.

Business
The trustees normally meet five times a year, and are responsible for the conduct of the Edinburgh University Press.

Edinburgh University Press achieved combined book and journal revenues of over £4,000,000 for the year ending 31 July 2021, a 9% increase on the previous year, earning a profit of £316,000.

References

External links
Official website – Corporate information and journals publishing programme
Official website – books publishing programme

University of Edinburgh
University presses of the United Kingdom
Book publishing companies of Scotland
1953 establishments in Scotland
Publishing companies established in 1953
Companies based in Edinburgh
British companies established in 1953